A20, A 20, A.20 or A-20 may refer to:

Vehicles
 A-20 Havoc, a U.S.-designed attack aircraft used in World War II
 A20 heavy tank, a British tank which did not enter production but of which a downsized version became the A22 Churchill tank
 A-20 tank, one of the prototypes of Soviet T-34 tank
 Aero A.20, a Czech fighter plane
 Arrows A20, a race car
 Fiat A.20, an engine powering the 1925 Italian Ansaldo A.120 aircraft
 Focke-Wulf A 20, a 1927 German airliner
 JAC Heyue A20, a subcompact car
 Junkers A 20, a predecessor of the Junkers A 35 aircraft

Other uses
 A20 cell line, a cell line.
 A20 line, an address line on the system bus of x86 processors
 University of Aberdeen (UCAS institution code)
 British NVC community A20 (Ranunculus peltatus community), a plant community
 Dance Dance Revolution A20, the latest version of Konami's arcade rhythm game series
 English Opening (Encyclopedia of chess openings code)
 List of A20 roads
 Oshiage Station (station code), a train station in Sumida, Tokyo, Japan
 Samsung Galaxy A20, smartphone released in 2019
 TNFAIP3 or A20, a zinc finger protein that inhibits NF-kappa B activation
 A-20, a character in the Japanese .hack//Sign anime, whose voice is given by Atsuko Enomoto

See also

 AXX (disambiguation)